4,4′-Bis(dimethylamino)benzhydrol is an organic compound with the formula (Me2NC6H4)2CH(OH), where Me is methyl.  It is a white solid that is soluble is a variety of organic solvents.  The compound is notable as the reduced derivative of Michler's ketone.  It is a precursor to triarylmethane dyes.

References

Anilines
Dimethylamino compounds
Secondary alcohols
Benzhydryl compounds